Lester Bois Goble (July 23, 1932 - December 2,2019) was a former American football halfback who played two seasons with the Chicago Cardinals of the National Football League. He was drafted by the Chicago Cardinals in the thirteenth round of the 1954 NFL Draft. He played college football at Alfred University and attended Waverly High School in Waverly, New York.

References

External links
Just Sports Stats

1932 births
2019 deaths
Players of American football from New York (state)
American football halfbacks
Alfred Saxons football players
Chicago Cardinals players
People from Waverly, Tioga County, New York